Annapia Gandolfi (born 29 June 1964) is an Italian fencer. She won a silver medal in the women's team foil event at the 1988 Summer Olympics.

References

External links
 
 

1964 births
Living people
Italian female fencers
Italian foil fencers
Olympic fencers of Italy
Fencers at the 1988 Summer Olympics
Olympic silver medalists for Italy
Olympic medalists in fencing
Sportspeople from Pisa
Medalists at the 1988 Summer Olympics
Universiade medalists in fencing
Universiade silver medalists for Italy
Medalists at the 1987 Summer Universiade
20th-century Italian women
21st-century Italian women